The 2011 Newcastle City Council election took place on 5 May 2011 to elect one third of the members of Newcastle City Council in England. The elections took place on the same day as other local elections.

The result saw the Labour Party gain 12 seats from the Liberal Democrats, taking control of the council for the first time in seven years.

2011
2011 English local elections